The European Health Telematics Observatory (EHTO) is a non-profit organization which collects, analyses and makes available in a user-friendly form information on developments in the field of health telematics. The organization contributes to the deployment of health telematics applications and standards in Europe. EHTO works on the dissemination of results of the European Telematics Applications Programme (TAP) of the Fourth Framework Programme to the European health care sector.

Participants
 Portugal: Portugal Telecom	
 Belgium: RAMIT (Research in Advanced Medical Informatics and Telematics)
 France: CNEH (Centre National de l'Equipement Hospitalier)
 Ireland: IHC Centre for Health Informatics
 Spain: IETT Ingenieria y Prevencion de Riesgos
 Greece: BIOTRAST
 Finland: VTT Information Technology

See also
 Health informatics
 European Institute for Health Records
 European Health Telematics Association (EHTEL)
 ProRec

Sources
 EHTO (Doc)
 European Telematics

External links
 European Health Telematics Observatory

Health informatics organizations
Information technology organizations based in Europe
Health and the European Union